KMSD (95.1 FM & 1510 AM) is a radio station licensed to serve Milbank, South Dakota. The station is owned by Prairie Winds Broadcasting. It airs a classic hits format.

Ownership
On June 18, 1999, Success Broadcasting Corporation transferred its license of KMSD to Pheasant Country Broadcasting, Inc.

On October 6, 1999, Pheasant Country Broadcasting, Inc agreed to transfer the assets of KMSD to Big Stone Broadcasting, Inc.

On August 3, 2007, Armada Media-Watertown, Inc. agreed to purchase the assets of radio stations KMSD, KBWS-FM, KDIO and KPHR-FM from Big Stone Broadcasting, Inc., and Pheasant Country Broadcasting, Inc  for $2.9 million.

On June 25, 2019, Armada Media sold KMSD, four sister stations, and a translator to Prairie Winds Broadcasting for a total price of $1.5 million  The sale was consummated on August 30, 2019.

Programming
KMSD's current programming consists of Classic Hits/News/Talk. KMSD started to broadcast on FM translator K252FB 98.3 FM in February 2012.  In late 2020, KMSD switched their FM simulcast from K252FB 98.3 to K236CU 95.1.  KMSD broadcasts Milbank High School Football and both Milbank girls' and boys' basketball, along with Legion baseball.

References

External links
Official Website

MSD
Classic hits radio stations in the United States
Radio stations established in 1977
1977 establishments in South Dakota